John B. Goodman (August 15, 1901 – June 30, 1991) was an American art director. He won an Oscar and was nominated for three more in the category Best Art Direction. He worked on 208 films between 1934 and 1968, including It's a Gift (1934) starring W. C. Fields. Goodman was a known bibliophile as well, with particular interests in American maritime history, early sailing ships, the American West, California, and the Gold Rush. These personal interests complemented his professional work, enabling Goodman to craft historically accurate sets.

Selected filmography
Goodman won an Academy Award for Best Art Direction and was nominated for three more:
 If I Were King (1938 - nominated)
 The Spoilers (1942 - nominated)
 Phantom of the Opera (1943 - won)
 The Climax (1944 - nominated)

References

External links

John B. Goodman Collection MSS 26. Special Collections & Archives, UC San Diego Library.

1901 births
1991 deaths
American art directors
Artists from Denver
Best Art Direction Academy Award winners